Stender is a surname of Germanic or Nordic origin and may refer to:

Gotthard Friedrich Stender (1714–1796), Latvian grammarian, lexicographer, and poet
Inger Stender (1912–1989), Danish actress
Linda Stender, American politician
Margaret Stender, American businesswomen and marketer
Paul Stender, American Race Driver & Daredevil 

German-language surnames
Occupational surnames